Ashot-Sahak Artsruni (died 991) was the fourth King of Vaspurakan, from the Artsruni dynasty. On the death of his father Abusahl-Hamazasp in 968/969, the kingdom was divided among his three sons, and Ashot, as the eldest, retained the royal title and the suzerainty over his younger brothers. On his death he was succeeded as king by his brother Gurgen-Khachik, who bypassed the rights of Ashot's sons.

991 deaths
10th-century monarchs of Vaspurakan
Artsruni dynasty
Year of birth unknown
10th-century Armenian people